Behnke is a surname originating from west Prussia and the western part of Pomerania, which is now modern north west Poland and north east Germany.

People
 Albert R. Behnke (1903–1992), American physician
 Bev Behnke, American curler
 Elmer Behnke (1929–2018), American basketball player
 Gerhard Behnke (1910–1962), German Wehrmacht officer
 Gunther Behnke (born 1963), retired German basketball player
 Heinrich Behnke (1898–1979), German mathematician
 Heinrich Behnke (Medal of Honor) (1882–1952), United States Navy seaman who received the Medal of Honor
 Heinz Behnke (1919–2002), German Wehrmacht officer
 Julia Behnke (born 1993), German handball player
 Robert E. Behnke (1932–1999), Democratic assemblyman
 Robert J. Behnke (1929–2013), American fisheries biologist
 Stephen H. Behnke, former Director of Ethics Office of the American Psychological

See also
 Benke
 Behncke
 Benkei

Low German surnames